Piazza dei Signori is a city square in Verona, Italy.

Buildings around the square
 Palazzo della Ragione, Verona (Palazzo del Comune)
 Palazzo Domus Nova
 Casa della Pietà
 Palazzo di Cansignorio
 Palazzo del Podestà, Verona
 Loggia del Consiglio

Monument to Dante 
The monument to Dante Alighieri is a statue representing him, made in memory of his 6th centenary from his birth. When Dante was exiled from Florence he was a long guest in Verona. The statue is made of marble, three meters high and resting on a marble pedestal.

Piazzas in Verona